Fouzi Ayoub Sabri is a Saudi Arabian businessman, engineer and car designer who founded, owns and sits as current CEO of Al-Araba Company for vehicle customizing and vehicle armouring. He is the creator of the first Saudi car, Al Araba 1.

References

External links
www.Al-Araba.com

Saudi Arabian automobile designers
People from Jeddah
Saudi Arabian businesspeople
Living people
Year of birth missing (living people)